The 38th parallel north is a circle of latitude that is 38 degrees north of the Earth's equatorial plane. It crosses Europe, the Mediterranean Sea, Asia, the Pacific Ocean, North America, and the Atlantic Ocean. The 38th parallel north formed the border between North and South Korea prior to the Korean War.

At this latitude, the Sun is visible for 14 hours, 48 minutes during the summer solstice and 9 hours, 32 minutes during the winter solstice.

Around the world
Starting at the Prime Meridian heading eastward, the 38th parallel north passes through:
{| class="wikitable plainrowheaders"
! scope="col" width="125" | Co-ordinates
! scope="col" | Country, territory or sea
! scope="col" | Notes
|-
| style="background:#b0e0e6;" | 
! scope="row" style="background:#b0e0e6;" | Mediterranean Sea
| style="background:#b0e0e6;" | Passing just north of the island of Marettimo,  (at )
|-
| 
! scope="row" | 
| Islands of Levanzo and Sicily
|-
| style="background:#b0e0e6;" | 
! scope="row" style="background:#b0e0e6;" | Mediterranean Sea
| style="background:#b0e0e6;" | Strait of Messina
|-
| 
! scope="row" | 
| Passing through Reggio di Calabria (southern suburbs)
|-valign="top"
| style="background:#b0e0e6;" | 
! scope="row" style="background:#b0e0e6;" | Mediterranean Sea
| style="background:#b0e0e6;" | Ionian Sea - passing between the islands of Kefalonia (at ) and Zakynthos (at ), 
|-
| 
! scope="row" | 
| Passing through Athens (northern suburbs)
|-
| style="background:#b0e0e6;" | 
! scope="row" style="background:#b0e0e6;" | Aegean Sea
| style="background:#b0e0e6;" |
|-
| 
! scope="row" | 
| Islands of Petalioi and Euboea
|-
| style="background:#b0e0e6;" | 
! scope="row" style="background:#b0e0e6;" | Aegean Sea
| style="background:#b0e0e6;" | Passing just north of the island of Andros (at ), 
|-
| 
! scope="row" | 
| Passing through Konya, Niğde and İzmir (southern suburbs)
|-
| 
! scope="row" | 
| Passing just south of Tabriz
|-
| style="background:#b0e0e6;" | 
! scope="row" style="background:#b0e0e6;" | Caspian Sea
| style="background:#b0e0e6;" |
|-
| 
! scope="row" | 
| 
|-
| 
! scope="row" | 
|
|-
| 
! scope="row" | 
| Passing just north of Ashgabat
|-
| 
! scope="row" | 
|
|-
| 
! scope="row" | 
|
|-
| 
! scope="row" | 
|
|-
| 
! scope="row" | 
|
|-valign="top"
| 
! scope="row" | 
| Xinjiang  Qinghai  Gansu  Inner Mongolia  Ningxia  Inner Mongolia  Shaanxi − for around   Inner Mongolia − for around   Shaanxi  Shanxi — passing just north of Taiyuan  Hebei — passing just south of Shijiazhuang  Shandong
|-
| style="background:#b0e0e6;" | 
! scope="row" style="background:#b0e0e6;" | Yellow Sea
| style="background:#b0e0e6;" | Passing just north of Baengnyeong Island (at ), 
|-
| 
! scope="row" | 
| Ongjin Peninsula — South Hwanghae Province
|-
| style="background:#b0e0e6;" | 
! scope="row" style="background:#b0e0e6;" | Yellow Sea
| style="background:#b0e0e6;" | Ongjin Bay
|-valign="top"
| 
! scope="row" | 
| South Hwanghae Province North Hwanghae Provincepassing just north of Kaesong
|-valign="top"
| 
! scope="row" | 
| Gyeonggi Province- Passing through Paju, Yeoncheon County, Pocheon, Gapyeong County  Gangwon Province - Passing through Hwacheon County, Chuncheon, (passing just north of Soyang Reservoir), Inje County, Yangyang County
|-
| style="background:#b0e0e6;" | 
! scope="row" style="background:#b0e0e6;" | Sea of Japan
| style="background:#b0e0e6;" |
|-valign="top"
| 
! scope="row" | 
| Island of Sado:— Niigata Prefecture
|-
| style="background:#b0e0e6;" | 
! scope="row" style="background:#b0e0e6;" | Sea of Japan
| style="background:#b0e0e6;" |
|-valign="top"
| 
! scope="row" | 
| Island of Honshū:— Niigata Prefecture Passing just north of Niigata City— Yamagata Prefecture— Miyagi Prefecture
|-
| style="background:#b0e0e6;" | 
! scope="row" style="background:#b0e0e6;" | Pacific Ocean
| style="background:#b0e0e6;" |
|-valign="top"
| 
! scope="row" | 
| California - passing through Pinole and StocktonNevada - passing just south of Tonopah Utah - passing through Capitol Reef and Canyonlands National Parks  Colorado - passing through Ouray, and then just south of Pueblo Kansas - passing just south of Newton Missouri - passing through Camdenton and just north of Rolla Illinois - passing just south of Mount Vernon Indiana - passing through Evansville Kentucky - passing through Lexington West Virginia - passing just north of Beckley  Virginia - passing just south of Charlottesville 
|-
| style="background:#b0e0e6;" | 
! scope="row" style="background:#b0e0e6;" | Chesapeake Bay
| style="background:#b0e0e6;" |
|-valign="top"
| 
! scope="row" | 
| Maryland - passing just north of Smith Island and Crisfield Virginia - passing just north of Chincoteague
|-
| style="background:#b0e0e6;" | 
! scope="row" style="background:#b0e0e6;" | Atlantic Ocean
| style="background:#b0e0e6;" | Passing between Pico (at ) and São Miguel (at ) islands, Azores, 
|-valign="top"
| 
! scope="row" | 
| Setúbal District Beja District - passing just south of Beja
|-valign="top"
| 
! scope="row" | 
| Andalusia Extremadura Region of Murcia - passing just north of Murcia Valencian Community
|-
| style="background:#b0e0e6;" | 
! scope="row" style="background:#b0e0e6;" | Mediterranean Sea
| style="background:#b0e0e6;" |
|}

Korea

Japan had ruled the Korean peninsula between 1910 and 1945. When Japan surrendered in August 1945, the 38th parallel was established as the boundary between Soviet and American occupation zones. This parallel divided the Korean peninsula roughly in the middle. In 1948, this parallel became the boundary between the Democratic People's Republic of Korea (North Korea) and the Republic of Korea (South Korea), both of which claim to be the government of the whole of Korea. On 25 June 1950, after a series of cross-border raids and gunfire from both the Northern and the Southern sides, the North Korean Army crossed the 38th parallel and invaded South Korea. This sparked the United Nations Security Council Resolution 82 which called for the North to return its troops to behind the 38th parallel and condemned the Korean War, with United Nations troops (mostly American) helping South Korean troops to defend South Korea.

After the Armistice agreement was signed on July 27, 1953, a new line was established to separate North Korea and South Korea. This Military Demarcation Line is surrounded by a Demilitarized Zone. The demarcation line crosses the 38th parallel, from the southwest to the northeast. The Demarcation Line is often confused with 38th parallel, but as can be seen in the image of the map, the two are not the same.

See also
37th parallel north
38th parallel structures
39th parallel north
Circle of latitude

References

Further reading
 Oberdorfer, Don. The Two Koreas: A Contemporary History. (1997)
 38th parallel (geopolitics) at the Encyclopædia Britannica

n38
Geography of Korea